Chryse was a town of ancient Caria, mentioned by Stephanus of Byzantium as being near Halicarnassus.

The site of Chryse is unlocated.

References

Populated places in ancient Caria
Former populated places in Turkey
Lost ancient cities and towns